The Boyne River  is a river located in Central Queensland, Australia.

The river descends from the western slopes of the range and flows generally north by east parallel with the Gladstone-Monto Road through the Boyne Valley. The river enters Lake Awoonga where it flows east by north, crossed by the Bruce Highway near Riverview, and finally discharging into the Port Curtis and the Coral Sea. The river descends  over its  course, joined by thirteen tributaries from source to river mouth. The mouth is located between the twin towns of Boyne Island and Tannum Sands. A bridge was built to cross the river joining the two towns in 1980.

The river is dammed by the Awoonga Dam which is the major water source for the Gladstone region.

The Queensland Department of Environment and Heritage Protection consider the Boyne River to be the southern habitat extent of the saltwater crocodile. However, crocodiles can occasionally be found as far south as the Mary River.

The river was named in 1823 by John Oxley as it reminded him of the River Boyne in Ireland.

See also

References

External links
 Australian drainage divisions and river basins

Rivers of Queensland
Central Queensland
Bodies of water of the Coral Sea